Crucișor is a commune of 2,226 inhabitants situated in Satu Mare County, Romania. It is composed of three villages: Crucișor, Iegheriște (Alsóhuta) and Poiana Codrului (Szelestyehuta).

References

Communes in Satu Mare County